The Kollidam (referred to as Coleroon in Colonial English) is a river in southeastern India. The Kollidam is the northern distributary of the Kaveri River as it flows through the delta of Thanjavur.  It splits from the main branch of the Kaveri River at the island of Srirangam and flows eastward into the Bay of Bengal.  The distribution system in Kollidam lies at Lower Anaicut which is an island of river Kollidam.

Heavy floods in 2005 necessitated the flood prevention works along the Kollidam river by the Public Works Department (PWD).

References

Rivers of Tamil Nadu
Distributaries
Tributaries of the Kaveri River
Rivers of India